Pnina Moed Kass (born 1938) is a Belgian writer.

Biography 
Pnina Kass was born in Belgium and grew up in New York City. After studying political science and art history, she worked in the advertising and music industry. She taught high school English both in the United States and later in Israel.

Her literary work includes short stories that have been published in newspapers, and anthologies, scripts, lyrics, storybook stories and the novel Real Time (2004).

The author lives near Tel Aviv.

Works 
 Stevie's Tricycle (1982)
 Tommy's New Bed (1984)
  Berele, a series in Hebrew (1980s)
 Real Time (German: Echtzeit) (2004)

Awards 

 International Reading Award for Best Young Adult Short Story
 2005: National Jewish Book Award
 2004: Sydney Taylor Book Award

References 

Belgian writers
Israeli writers
1938 births
Living people